Presidential elections were held in the Comoros on 16 April and 14 May 2006. As it was the turn of the island of Anjouan to hold the union presidency, a primary election was held in Anjouan on 16 April, prior to a national election on 14 May. The result was a victory for  Ahmed Abdallah Mohamed Sambi, who received 58% of the vote in the national election.

Background
The first presidential elections held under the new constitution were conducted on 10 March and 14 April 2002. In the 10 March primary held on the island of Grande Comore, Azali Assoumani finished first out of a field of nine candidates with 39.81% of the vote. Mahamoud Mradabi and Saïd Ali Kemal also qualified to participate in the second round, obtaining 15.69% and 10.68%, respectively. However, Mradabi and Kemal alleged that irregularities had occurred during the primary and decided to boycott the 14 April poll. As a result, Azali Assoumani won approximately 80% of the vote.

A total of fourteen candidates were cleared to participate in the 2006 primaries by the country's constitutional court. However, one of the approved candidates, Antoy Abdou, withdrew prior to election day.

Electoral system
After a period of political instability that began in the late 1990s and saw the (unrecognized) secession of Anjouan and Mohéli, a new constitution was approved in a December 2001 referendum. It created a union of semi-autonomous islands, each with its own constitution, president, and assembly. The position of union president, who is the head of state and government, rotates between the three islands every four years.

A primary election is held on the island that will hold the union presidency. The three candidates who receive the most votes then stand in a nationwide election with a simple plurality needed to win.

Results

External links
BBC News: Q & A - Comoros Elections
BBC News: Comoros polls test peace plan

Comoros
Presidential election
Presidential elections in the Comoros
April 2006 events in Africa
May 2006 events in Africa